(Thou wilt sprinkle me), WAB 4, is a sacred motet composed by Anton Bruckner. It is a setting of the Latin Asperges me, the antiphon used for the celebration of Asperges.

History 
In 1843–44, Bruckner composed this first setting of Asperges me during his stay in Kronstorf. It is not known when it was performed at that time.

The work, the original manuscript of which is lost, exists as a transcription by Arthur Bauer. The motet was first published in volume III/2, pp. 140–141 of the Göllerich/Auer biography.

Music 
The work is a setting of 32 bars in F major of the Asperges me for mixed choir a cappella.

According to the Catholic practice, the incipit ("Asperges me") is not composed and has to be intoned by the priest in Gregorian mode before the choir begins. The score is in two sections. Section 1 (7 bars) begins with "Domine, hysopo" and ends with "dealbabor". Section 2 (18 bars) begins with the remaining of the text, and is followed by the doxology ("Gloria Patri"). Thereafter the incipit is repeated by the choir in unison, concluded by a da capo of section 1. The second section contains audacious modulations, similar to the contemporaneous Kronstorfer Messe.

Discography 
There is a single commercial recording of Bruckner's first Asperges me:
 Philipp von Steinäcker, Vocalensemble Musica Saeculorum, Bruckner: Pange lingua - Motetten - CD: Fra Bernardo FB 1501271, 2015

References

Sources 
 August Göllerich, Anton Bruckner. Ein Lebens- und Schaffens-Bild,  – posthumous edited by Max Auer by G. Bosse, Regensburg, 1932
 Hansjürgen Schäfer, Anton Bruckner. Ein Führer durch Leben und Werk. Henschel Verlag, Berlin, 1996. 
 Anton Bruckner – Sämtliche Werke, Band XXI: Kleine Kirchenmusikwerke, Musikwissenschaftlicher Verlag der Internationalen Bruckner-Gesellschaft, Hans Bauernfeind and Leopold Nowak (Editor), Vienna, 1984/2001
 Cornelis van Zwol, Anton Bruckner 1824–1896 – Leven en werken, uitg. Thoth, Bussum, Netherlands, 2012. 
 Uwe Harten, Anton Bruckner. Ein Handbuch. , Salzburg, 1996. .

External links 
 
 Asperges F-Dur, WAB 4 Critical discography by Hans Roelofs 

Motets by Anton Bruckner
1844 compositions
Compositions in F major